Khalilabad railway station is a small railway station in Sant Kabir Nagar district, Uttar Pradesh. Its code is KLD. The station serves the city of Khalilabad. The station consists of three platforms. The platforms are not well sheltered.

The station lies on the Gorakhpur–Basti–Lucknow line.

References

Railway stations in Sant Kabir Nagar district
Lucknow NER railway division